Gallions Reach DLR station is a station on the Docklands Light Railway (DLR) in the Royal Docks area of east London. It serves the recent residential developments around Royal Albert Dock. The station is located on the DLR's Beckton branch, between Cyprus and Beckton stations. It is in Travelcard Zone 3.

The crossover junction north of the station, which is normally used for trains from the west going to Beckton DLR depot, can also be used for trains from Beckton and Poplar to reverse. This is the easternmost station on the DLR, as Beckton is actually further west.

Similar to other stations on the Beckton branch, the platforms have not been extended to accommodate 3-car trains, with selective door operation being used instead.

History 

When the station opened with the Beckton extension in 1994, it was surrounded by brownfield land such as the old Beckton Gas Works, which closed in 1970. Given this, ridership was very low, despite suburban residential development in nearby Beckton.

Ridership grew following the opening of the UEL Docklands Campus and Gallions Reach Shopping Park in the early 2000s and residential development around Royal Albert Dock in the 2010s. By 2019, ridership had increased to 1.42m a year.

In the mid-2000s, there were proposals for a DLR extension to Dagenham Dock, which would have branched off east of the station. This was cancelled in 2008. A route of East London Transit was also proposed to pass through the area.

The local area has also been proposed for various road crossings of the River Thames – the East London River Crossing and Gallions Reach Crossing.

Future

In the mid-2010s, an extension of the DLR to Thamesmead was proposed. , the proposed route of the extension diverges just after Gallions Reach, turning east to pass by Beckton DLR depot before heading to Thamesmead via Beckton Riverside.

Connections
London Buses routes 101, 262, 366 and night route N551 serve the station.

See also
 Gallions railway station
 Manor Way railway station

References

External links

 Docklands Light Railway website – Gallions Reach station page

Docklands Light Railway stations in the London Borough of Newham
Railway stations in Great Britain opened in 1994
Beckton